This list comprises all players who have participated in at least one league match for Phoenix Rising FC (previously known as Arizona United SC) since the team's first season in 2014. Players who were on the roster but never played a first team game are not listed; players who appeared for the team in other competitions (US Open Cup, CONCACAF Champions League, etc.) but never actually made a USL Championship appearance are noted at the bottom of the page where appropriate.

A "†" denotes players who only appeared in a single match.

A
  Saad Abdul-Salaam
  Seyi Adekoya
  Tobi Adewole
  Jose Aguinaga
  Daniel Antúnez
  Eder Arreola
  Solomon Asante
  Richmond Antwi
  Eric Avila
  Gladson Awako
  Carlos Anguiano

B
  Bradlee Baladez
  Jon Bakero
  Gibson Bardsley
  Jack Barmby
  Lamar Batista
  Noah Billingsley
  Kyle Bjornethun
  Tristan Blackmon
  Tyler Blackwood
  Milton Blanco
  Omar Bravo
  Shaft Brewer Jr.
  Jack Baker

C
  Joey Calistri
  Tony Cascio
  Channing Chasten
  Dennis Chin
  A. J. Cochran
  Josh Cohen
  Chris Cortez
  Nick Costa
  Jose Cuevas

D
  Kadeem Dacres
  Rufat Dadashov
  Mike da Fonte
  Edward Delgado
  Paolo DelPiccolo
  Aaron Dennis
  Robbie Derschang
  Amadou Dia
  Joey Dillon
  Irakoze Donasiyano
  Didier Drogba
  Devante Dubose
  Mustapha Dumbuya
  Niall Dunn †

E
  Otis Earle
  David Egbo
  Marcus Epps

F
  Marcus Ferkranus
  Collin Fernandez
  Joe Farrell
  Romeo Filipović
  Junior Flemmings
  Ryan Flood
  Billy Forbes
  Kevaughn Frater

G
  Bryan Gallego
  Danny Garcia
  Sam Garza
  Blair Gavin
  Jordan Gibbons
  Brock Granger
  A. J. Gray
  J. J. Greer
  Devon Grousis
  Iván Gutiérrez

H
  Sam Hamilton
  Blaize Hardy †
  Jacob Harris
  Sivert Haugli
  Romilio Hernandez
  Matthew Hurlow-Paonessa
  Greg Hurst

J
  Adam Jahn
  Jason Johnson
  Spencer Johnson
  Lamin Jawneh

K
  Ansuh Kanneh †
  Matt Kassel
  Jeremy Kelly
  Peter Kelly
  Darnell King
  TJ Knight †
  Owusu-Ansah Kontoh
  Lagos Kunga

L
  Kevon Lambert
  Austin Ledbetter
  Jonathan Levin
  David Loera
  Benji Lopez
  Damion Lowe
  Ben Lundt
  Zac Lubin

M
  Manuel Madrid
  Josh Martinez †
  Doueugui Mala
  George Malki
  Darren Mattocks
  Duncan McCormick
  Kevin Mearse †
  Santi Moar
  Scott Morrison
  Victor Muñoz
  James Musa

N
  Evan Newton
  Baboucarr Njie

O
  Jon Okafor

P
  Javi Pérez
  Joshua Pérez
  Brandon Poltronieri

Q
  Aodhan Quinn

R
  Peter Ramage
  José Ramos †
  Andre Rawls
  Claudio Repetto
  Charles Renken
  Jordan Rideout
  Luca Ricci
  Alessandro Riggi
  Julian Ringhof
  Jalen Robinson
  Arturo Rodríguez
  Luke Rooney
  Damian Rosales
  Freddy Ruiz
  Tyler Ruthven

S
  Widner Saint Cyr
  Hayden Sargis
  Prince Saydee
  Luke Schaefer †
  Tate Schmitt
  Jordan Schweitzer
  Luis Manuel Seijas
  Alex Shinsky
  Mike Seth
  Christian Silva
  Matheus Silva
  Zakari Smith †
  Ben Spencer
  Jordan Stagmiller
  Sam Stanton
  Jordan Stewart
  Brad Stisser
  Brandon Swartzendruber

T
  Long Tan
  Miguel Timm
  Joseph Toby
  Jonathan Top
  Gabriel Torres
  Schillo Tshuma
  Jacole Turner †

U
  Uchenna Uzo

V
  Rob Valentino
  Peter-Lee Vassell
  Victor Vásquez
  Devin Vega
  Cameron Vickers
  Minh Vu

W
  Kody Wakasa
  Evan Waldrep
  Rodney Wallace
  Matt Watson
  Adam West
  Andrew Wheeler-Omiunu
  Corey Whelan
  Tom Williams
  London Woodberry
  Carl Woszczynski
  Shaun Wright-Phillips

Z
  Eduard Zea

References

A
Phoenix Rising FC
P
Phoenix Rising FC
Association football player non-biographical articles